Dijana Radović (born 1 September 1989) is a Serbian politician. She has served in the National Assembly of Serbia since 2020 as a member of the Socialist Party of Serbia (Socijalistička partija Srbije, SPS).

Private career
Radović is from Priboj. She has a degree in political science and has been active with the Socialist Youth of Serbia.

Politician

Municipal politics
Radović was given the sixth position on the SPS's electoral list for the Priboj municipal assembly in the 2012 Serbian local elections. The list won five seats; she was not immediately elected but received a mandate on 19 July 2012 as the replacement for another party member. She served for the term that followed and was for a time the SPS's assembly leader.

She was promoted to the third position on the SPS list in the 2016 local elections and was re-elected when the list won four seats. She resigned her seat on 15 June 2016.

Parliamentarian
Radović received the fifteenth position on the SPS's list in the 2020 Serbian parliamentary election and was elected when the list won thirty-two seats. The Socialists continued their participation in Serbia's coalition government after the election, and Radović served with the administration's parliamentary majority.

In her first assembly term, Radović was a member of the agriculture, forestry, and water management committee; a deputy member of the committee on constitutional and legal issues; a deputy member of the defence and internal affairs committee; a deputy member of the foreign affairs committee; a deputy member of the committee on human and minority rights and gender equality; a deputy member of the committee on the economy, regional development, trade, tourism, and energy; a deputy member of the European integration committee; a deputy member of the committee on administrative, budgetary, and mandate issues; and a deputy member of the European Union–Serbia stabilisation and association committee. She was also the head of Serbia's parliamentary friendship group with Trinidad and Tobago and a member of the friendship groups with Bosnia and Herzegovina, Cambodia, China, Egypt, Ireland, Japan, Russia, Slovakia, Tunisia, the United Kingdom, and the United States of America.

She was promoted to the fourth position on the SPS's list for the 2022 parliamentary election. This was tantamount to election, and she was indeed re-elected when the list won thirty-one seats. She remains a member of the agriculture committee and is a deputy member of the defence committee; a deputy member of the committee on the judiciary, public administration, and local self-government; a deputy member of the human rights committee; a deputy member of the European integration committee; and a member of the European Union–Serbia stabilization and association committee. She is once again the leader of Serbia's parliamentary friendship group with Trinidad and Tobago and is a member of the friendship groups with Australia, Austria, Bosnia and Herzegovina, Bulgaria, Caribbean countries (Antigua and Barbuda, Barbados, Belize, Dominica, Haiti, St. Lucia, St. Kitts and Nevis), China, the Democratic Republic of the Congo, Denmark, Egypt, Eswatini, Greece, Hungary, Ireland, Japan, Liechtenstein, New Zealand and the Pacific Island countries (Vanuatu, Tuvalu, Fiji, Nauru, Palau, Papua New Guinea, Solomon Islands), Slovakia, Spain, Suriname, Sweden, and Venezuela.

References

1989 births
Living people
People from Priboj
Members of the National Assembly (Serbia)
Socialist Party of Serbia politicians
Women members of the National Assembly (Serbia)